Professor Ion A. Atanasiu (25 September 1894 – 19 December 1978) was the founder of the Romanian School of Electrochemistry and the first to teach this subject in Romania. He is known as the originator of cerimetry, an analytical method based on Cerium (IV) as titration reagent.

Works
I. Atanasiu, G. Facsko Electrochimie.Principii teoretice 1958

References
Biography of Prof. Atanasiu by Em. Bratu and A. Calusaru in Rev. Roum. Chim., 1980, 25, pp. 3–7.

Romanian chemists
1894 births
1978 deaths
Corresponding members of the Romanian Academy
Members of the Romanian Academy of Sciences